311 (pronounced "three eleven") is an American rock band from Omaha, Nebraska. The band was formed in 1988 by vocalist and guitarist Nick Hexum, lead guitarist Jim Watson, bassist Aaron "P-Nut" Wills, and drummer Chad Sexton. Watson was replaced by Tim Mahoney in 1990.  In 1992, Doug "SA" Martinez joined as a second vocalist and turntablist.

311 has released 13 studio albums, two live albums, four compilation albums, four EPs and four DVDs. After a series of independent releases, 311 was signed to Capricorn Records in 1992 and released the albums Music (1993) and Grassroots (1994) to moderate success. They achieved greater success with their 1995 triple platinum self-titled album, which reached number 12 on the Billboard 200 on the strength of the singles "Down" and "All Mixed Up", the former of which topped the Billboard Hot Modern Rock Tracks in 1996. The band's next three albums—Transistor (1997), Soundsystem (1999), and From Chaos (2001)—were also successful, with the first going platinum and the last two going gold. Their 2004 compilation album Greatest Hits '93–'03 was also certified platinum. The band's most recent studio album is 2019's Voyager. As of 2011, 311 has sold over 8.5 million records in the United States.

The band's name was chosen by Aaron "P-Nut" Wills from the police code for indecent exposure in Omaha after a friend of the band was arrested and cited for skinny dipping in a public pool.

History

Early recordings (1988–1992)
311's first independent release was the Downstairs EP, which was recorded in 1989 in Nick Hexum's basement. Unlike many of their releases, it had no cover art. It features the song "Feels So Good," which was recreated/remastered in the album Music and is a staple of most of 311's live shows.

In 1990, 311 produced 300 cassettes of their second independent release, Dammit!, recorded at IEV Studios in Papillion, Nebraska.

In 1991, Tim Mahoney replaced Jim Watson on guitar and 311 released their third independent release, Unity, recorded at Rainbow Recording Studios in Omaha. 1000 CDs and 500 cassettes of Unity were printed; they were distributed through consignment and sold at shows. The band began to headline shows in local clubs, such as The Ranch Bowl and Sokol Auditorium. It was also around this time they recorded the since lost and often sought after track "Spooky Breakfast".

In 1992, SA Martinez, who had been making various appearances with 311 over the past years as a vocalist, was officially asked to join the band. 311 recorded a six-track demo, called Hydroponic, also recorded at Rainbow Recording Studios, and moved to Los Angeles. Within their first few months, 311 was signed to Capricorn Records.

Music and Grassroots (1993–1994)
Their first major record, Music, was released in 1993. The single "Do You Right" received airplay on modern rock stations and reached No. 27 on Billboards Modern Rock Tracks chart. However, the album failed to chart at the time. The album was produced by Eddy Offord, who famously produced Yes and Emerson, Lake & Palmer.

Financing their own tour, the band drove around in an old RV borrowed from Sexton's father and towed a Volkswagen bus which held their equipment. After tackling a steep incline while en route to an Omaha show, the RV caught fire. The only door out of the vehicle was surrounded by flames so the band jumped through the fire. All of their equipment and possessions were lost, though no one was seriously injured. The band continued their tour using borrowed equipment.

The following year, they released their second studio album, Grassroots.

Mainstream breakthrough (1995–2001)
In 1995, 311 released the self-titled 311 (colloquially known as "The Blue Album"). Produced by Ron St. Germain, the album was recorded live in contrast to their previous two albums in which all instruments were recorded separately. The first single "Don't Stay Home" was a modest success, reaching No. 29 on Billboards Modern Rock Tracks chart. But the follow-up single "Down", which was released 14 months after the album, received heavy airplay on mainstream radio, and the accompanying music video was on MTV's rotation. The song hit No. 1 on the Modern Rock chart. The band made their network television debut on Late Night with Conan O'Brien on August 23, 1995. The third single, "All Mixed Up", enjoyed almost identical success, reaching No. 4 on the Modern Rock chart. They also appeared on Late Show with David Letterman playing "Down".

In the following years, 311 continued touring and on August 5, 1997, they released Transistor, which debuted at No. 4 on the Billboard 200, their highest position on that chart. The album went platinum.

In 1998, 311 released Live, a live album from a 1997 performance in New Orleans, Louisiana. 311 also released Omaha Sessions, a compilation album from their early independent releases.

In 1999, 311 released their fifth major album, Soundsystem. The song "Come Original" reached No. 6 on Billboards Modern Rock Tracks chart. The second single, "Flowing", featured American Pie's Eddie Kaye Thomas in the music video.

Since 2000, the band has recorded every album at The Hive, a North Hollywood, California recording studio they purchased in 1995. The sessions for From Chaos, 311's sixth major record release, were the first to be held there. From Chaos was released in late 2001. Its first single, "You Wouldn't Believe" featured basketball star Shaquille O'Neal in the video.

Evolver and Don't Tread on Me (2002–2006)
311's seventh major release, Evolver (produced By Ron Saint Germain), came in 2003. In Summer 2003, 311 launched their inaugural Unity Tour. The tour included openers G. Love & Special Sauce, OAR, and Something Corporate.

In 2004, 311's cover of The Cure's "Love Song" became a No. 1 hit on the Modern Rock Tracks chart. It also reached No. 59 on the Billboard Hot 100, their first single to reach that chart. It was featured on the soundtrack for the motion picture 50 First Dates and then a few months later on their own Greatest Hits '93-'03. The compilation featured two new songs: "How Do You Feel?" and "First Straw".

In Summer 2004, 311 played a free show at a city park in Omaha for the city's 175th Anniversary Celebration. The band changed all marijuana-related lyrics in the songs they played for the appearance. Later that summer, then the band kicked off their second annual Unity Tour with openers The Roots and Medeski Martin & Wood.

On August 16, 2005, 311 released their eighth studio album, titled Don't Tread on Me. "Don't Tread on Me," the first single, reached No. 2 on the Billboard Modern Rock chart and No. 7 at Bubbling Under Hot 100 Singles.

In mid-2005, 311 kicked off their third annual Unity Tour with openers Papa Roach and Unwritten Law.

On July 20, 2006, 311 kicked off their Summer Unity Tour, playing 37 shows in 27 states and featuring opening bands Pepper and Wailers. After completion of the tour, 311 announced they would be taking a break from recording.

Uplifter and Universal Pulse (2007–2011)
In January 2007, 311 stepped back into their Hive Studios with Nick's younger brother Zack Hexum. They recorded a cover of Toots & the Maytals song "Reggae Got Soul" for the soundtrack from the film Surf's Up, which was released on June 5, 2007.

Their Summer Unity Tour in 2007 included supporting acts Matisyahu and The English Beat. In 2008, they featured opening acts Snoop Dogg and Fiction Plane.

Uplifter, 311's ninth studio album, was released on June 2, 2009. The album, produced at 311's Hive Recording Studios in Los Angeles by Bob Rock, debuted at No. 3 on the Billboard 200, the band's highest chart position in the U.S. to date. The band followed up the release of the album with tours in Summer and Fall 2009. They have completed their Spring 2010 tour, which included 311 Day 2010, held in Las Vegas, Nevada. A Summer tour with The Offspring began in June 2010. 311 also held a 2010 fall tour.

2009's Summer Unity Tour featured opening acts Ziggy Marley and The Expendables, and 2010's featured supporting act The Offspring and opening act Pepper.

In early 2011, 311 finished recording their tenth studio album called Universal Pulse at the Hive in Los Angeles, with producer Bob Rock. The album was released July 19, 2011. The album's first single, "Sunset in July" was released on June 3, 2011. Universal Pulse is their shortest album yet, only having 8 songs.

In 2011, Sublime With Rome and DJ Soulman & DJ Trichrome were the openers on the Unity Tour.

Stereolithic, Archive Compilation and Mosaic (2012–2017)
In Summer 2012, 311 embarked on their tenth annual Unity Tour with Slightly Stoopid, SOJA, and The Aggrolites.

On August 24, 2012, Doug "SA" Martinez told Phoenix's Up on the Sun that an eleventh 311 studio album was in the works and planned for release in 2013. However, on July 15, 2013, they announced the album would be released on March 11, 2014, to coincide with 311 Day 2014. The album was produced by Scotch Ralston.

On July 2, 2013, 311 started their eleventh annual Unity Tour with Cypress Hill and G. Love & Special Sauce. The tour ended on August 4, 2013.

Stereolithic, the band's first independently released studio album since 1991's Unity, was released on March 11, 2014.

On November 18, 2014, 311 released a live album, 311 with the Unity Orchestra – Live from New Orleans – 311 Day 2014. The album documents part of the 311 Day 2014 concert wherein the band was accompanied onstage by a symphony orchestra for nine songs.

311 Archive, a four-disc compilation album featuring 81 previously unreleased songs, B-sides, and demos, was released on June 30, 2015.

As of February 2016, according to Nick Hexum, 311 was working on a new album, and in February 2017, the band revealed the new album's title, Mosaic, on their PledgeMusic update feed. Six song titles were released to the public, "Hey Yo", "Island Sun", "Extension", "Too Much to Think", "Syntax Error", and "Too Late"; the first two were debuted at 311 Day 2016. 311 invited their fan base to submit a photo of themselves to be featured on the album artwork. Mosaic was released on June 23, 2017, and was met with positive reviews. It was their 12th studio album and their 10th consecutive to debut in the Top 10 of US Billboard 200. It debuted at number six, with 39,000 album-equivalent units, of which 37,000 were pure album sales.

On March 9, 2017, the band released "Too Much to Think", the first single from Mosaic. Following that, 311 released the singles "Too Late" and "Perfect Mistake"

Voyager and next album (2018–present)
In 2018, 311 and The Offspring toured together on the Never-Ending Summer tour. That summer, The Offspring released a cover of 311's "Down" and 311 released a "reggaefied" cover of The Offspring's "Self Esteem". Hexum states that 311 had "the bulk of an album written" and is working with producer/co-writer John Feldmann of Goldfinger on some tracks. Later that summer, Mahoney confirmed that they were working with both Scotch Ralston and John Feldmann on Voyager. Voyager released on July 12, 2019. The documentary Enlarged to Show Detail 3 was released to theaters for one day only on March 11, 2019.

On March 11, 2020, PRS Guitars asked the band if they were planning to make a new live album or follow-up to Voyager. Guitarist Tim Mahoney said, "This year is all about playing live and celebrating 30 years. Although we do have a few blocks of time set aside for new music writing and recording, the soonest for any new release would be 2021." As part of their 30th anniversary tour, the band was scheduled to co-headline a North American trek with Incubus in the summer of 2020, but it was cancelled because of the COVID-19 pandemic.

On May 16, 2022, P-Nut announced via Twitter that he would be taking a hiatus from the band after they had finished their upcoming tour schedule. On November 30, 2022, P-Nut followed up with an announcement also via Twitter that he will not be taking the hiatus, after having had discussions with the band and having seen support from his family and fans.

311 Day

On March 11, 2000, 311 began celebrating an unofficial holiday of their own creation called 311 Day. The band chose the date because March 11 is written in the United States as 3/11. Every other year on March 11, the band performs an extended concert for thousands of their fans.

311 Caribbean Festival Cruises and 311 Pow Wow Festival
In March 2011, 311 began hosting a Festival Cruise. The environment is similar to an outdoor music festival involving camping.

The 2011 Caribbean Festival Cruise departed on March 3, 2011, from Miami, FL aboard the Carnival Destiny for Grand Turk, Turk and Caicos. The festival cruise featured three shows, over four days leaving from Miami to Turks and Caicos, and featured guest bands: The Movement, DJ Soulman and Nocturnal Arts, Full Service, Pepper and The Expendables.

On May 10, 2012, 311 hosted their second Caribbean Festival Cruise on the Carnival Destiny, departing from Miami and landing on a private island, Half Moon Cay, in the Bahamas for three consecutive nights and featured guest bands including: The Dirty Heads, Shwayze, 2 Skinnee J's, DJ Soulman, Outlaw Nation, Shootyz Groove, BALLYHOO!, Passafire, Cisco, Full Service, DJ Trichrome, Exes Of Evil, Trailer Park Ninjas, Moral Defect among others.

311's 2013 Caribbean Festival Cruise departed Miami on March 1, 2013, on its new home, the Norwegian Pearl, but this time went to a different private island in the Bahamas, Great Stirrup Cay. The 2013 Caribbean Cruise featured guest bands and comedians including: Rebelution, Less Than Jake, Exes of Evil, DJ ABD, The Urge, Tom Green, Doug Benson, SA Martinez and Exes of Evil performing in their side project Ghostwolf. DJ Kilmore (From Incbus), BALLYHOO!, Badfish: A Tribute to Sublime, Bad Rabbits, The Aggrolites, DJ Soulam, Full Service, J Randy, Krooked Treez, Beat Squad, Trailer Park Ninjas, Hey Monea, DJ Trichome, and DJ ABD.

311's 2015 Caribbean Festival departed from Miami on February 25, 2015, aboard the Norwegian Pearl. It made port in Jamaica. The line up included 311 with three sets, Dirty Heads, Pepper, Chali 2na, RX Bandits, The Green, RDGLDGRN, Full Service, The Funk Hunters, Doug Benson, DJ Soulman, J Randy, Andy Haynes, Papafish, Beatcake, Singles, Tony Hinchcliffe, DJ Native Wayne, DJ Trichrome, The Unity All Stars, Headphone Disco among others.

2017 marked the fifth 311 Caribbean Cruise! Departed from Tampa to Cozumel, March 2–6, 2017, on board the Norwegian Jade as the Pearl was in drydock.  Lineup of bands, DJs and comedians, including Rebelution, Reel Big Fish, Stick Figure, People Under the Stairs, Ballyhoo!, RDGLDGRN, Los Stellarians (side project of 311 member SA Martinez) and ILL Communication. The band headlined set lists as usual and hosted other bands as well. 311 played their hit songs plus debuting two new tracks; "Extension" and "Too Late" while also covering Prince's "Let's Go Crazy".

During 311 Day 2022, Nick Hexum announced that the 311 Caribbean Cruise will return in 2023.

311 hosted their first "Pow Wow" Festival from August 4 to 6, 2011, at the Spirit of the Suwannee Music Park in Live Oak, FL. Along with 311, it featured DJ Trichome, Murs, SOJA, Deftones, DJ Soulman, The Movement, Full Service, Streetlight Manifesto, The Dirty Heads, Sublime with Rome, Shinobi Ninja, Ballyhoo!, The Supervillains, Ozomatli, G. Love & Special Sauce, and comedians Doug Benson and Graham Elwood. Along with fire performances by Nocturnal Arts. 311 played four sets and the album Transistor in its entirety.

311 business collaborations

Since 2015, the band has collaborated with Nebraska Brewing Company and Rock Brother Brewing on 311 Amber Ale. The beer is currently available in Florida, Georgia, South Carolina, Nebraska, and southern California with more midwest locations coming soon. Many varieties of the beer are now available for at-home delivery. 
In 2017, they also released a cannabis vapor pen dubbed the "Grassroots Uplifter." The pen is available in Colorado, Washington, Oregon and California. In 2018, Grassroots Uplifter v2 was released in California. 311 are also official media sponsors for BK Racing on the NASCAR Sprint Cup series.  The 311 logo appears on all BK Racing cars

Musical style and influences
311's music is a blend of rock, reggae, hip hop and funk. 311 has been described as alternative rock, reggae rock, rap rock, funk metal, funk rock, rap metal, post-grunge, alternative metal and nu metal. 311's influences include The Clash, The Cure, Descendents, Red Hot Chili Peppers, Cypress Hill, De La Soul, A Tribe Called Quest, Led Zeppelin, Bob Marley, Fishbone, and Bad Brains.

Members

Current members
 Nick Hexum – lead vocals, rhythm guitar, keyboards (1988–present)
 Aaron "P-Nut" Wills – bass (1988–present)
 Chad Sexton – drums (1988–present)
 Tim Mahoney – lead guitar (1991–present)
 Doug "SA" Martinez – lead vocals, turntables (1992–present)

Former members
 Jim Watson – lead guitar (1990–1991)

Timeline

Side projects
 Nick Hexum – The Nick Hexum Quintet (2013), DJ Leisure (Sean Perry) vs DJ Lofton (Nick Hexum) – 'Battlestations' (1997),  
 Doug "SA" Martinez – Ghostwolf – vocals – 'Lunar Halos' (2012), Los Stellarians – vocals
 Aaron "P-Nut" Wills – Ghostwolf – bass – 'Lunar Halos' (2012), Hollows Follow – 'First Birthday' (2006)
 Chad Sexton – 'Introducing Zack Hexum...' (1998) – drums

Discography

Music (1993)
Grassroots (1994)
311 (1995)
Transistor (1997)
Soundsystem (1999)
From Chaos (2001)
Evolver (2003)
Don't Tread on Me (2005)
Uplifter (2009)
Universal Pulse (2011)
Stereolithic (2014)
Mosaic (2017)
Voyager (2019)

References

External links

Live311 website
311 Cruise website
Tim Mahoney interview by Brad Conroy

 
Alternative rock groups from Nebraska
American alternative metal musical groups
Capricorn Records artists
Funk rock musical groups
Musical groups established in 1988
Musical groups from Omaha, Nebraska
Musical quintets
Rap rock groups
Reggae rock groups
Rap metal musical groups
Volcano Entertainment artists
ATO Records artists
Cleopatra Records artists